Pepper Chicken is an Indian Hindi-language film directed by Ratan Sil Sarma. It stars Dipannita Sharma, Boloram Das, Baharul Islam, Ravi Sarma, and Monuj Borkotoky. The film was released theatrically on 6 November 2020.

Plot 
Pepper chicken is a story of a radio jockey who is getting married next day, she starts her journey by a cab leaving her job and the cab journey becomes horrific when they reach to a secluded place. The mystery of cab driver unravels with the story.

Cast 
 Dipannita Sharma
 Boloram Das
 Baharul Islam
 Ravi Sarma

References

External links 
 

2020s Hindi-language films
2020 films